Patel Taylor is an architectural practice based in Clerkenwell, London. Placemaking defines its work. It operates from its own studios in Rawstorne Street, in an old warehouse converted by the firm in 2011.

History 
Patel Taylor was founded by Pankaj Patel and Andrew Taylor in 1989 specialising in fusing together the elements of architecture, landscape and urban design and has since completed projects throughout the United Kingdom and in mainland Europe.

In particular its collaborative work with French landscape architect Allain Provost has produced the award-winning Eastside City Park and Thames Barrier Park.

Patel Taylor is working on some of the largest regeneration schemes in the UK, such as London Dock in Wapping and White City in West London. These developments are of the scale of city quarters, they create new mixed-use pieces of the capital, drawing on the grain that characterises London. The practice has completed a variety of major UK projects, such as the London Olympic Athletes’ Village, the award-winning Eastside City Park in Birmingham and the critically acclaimed Courtyard Housing in the Borough of Barking and Dagenham.

Patel Taylor's work often involves suggesting a framework that helps repair and reinforce a sense of place. Current and recent developments where this thinking is being applied include London Dock, White City, Earls Court, Wood Wharf, Southbank Place, Thames Barrier Park, Eastside City Park, Bow Schools and the multiple award winning Library & Student Centre at University of Essex.

The practice has received more than 40 design awards and was named Masterplanning and Public Realm Architect of the Year in the Building Design Awards 2013. Its 2017 Lombard Wharf residential tower in Battersea (London) was named Development of Outstanding Architectural Merit in the Evening Standard New Homes Awards 2018.

People
There are more than 50 people currently working at the Clerkenwell offices of Patel Taylor.

The practice includes architects, urban designers, landscape architects, designers, model makers, as well as technical specialists.

Directors

 Andrew Taylor
 Pankaj Patel

Projects

Projects include: 
 Eastside City Park in Birmingham
 Athletes' Village Guidelines 
 Athletes' Village Housing for the London 2012 Olympic Games.
Albert Sloman Library and Silberrad Student Centre, University of Essex, Colchester (2015) 
The Athletes' Village, London
Lowther Primary School, London
Putney Wharf Tower, London
In fill House, Camden, London
University of Wales, Aberystwyth
Orleans House Gallery, Twickenham
Thames View Housing, Barking, London
Stanley Mills, Stroud
Bow Schools, London
Portland College, Mansfield
Benslow Music School, Hitchin
Ivor Crewe Lecture Hall, University of Essex, Colchester (2007) 
Peace Park Pavilion, Leicestershire
Ty Asaf Arts Centre, North Wales
St Paul's School, London
United Reformed Church, Richmond, London
Thames Barrier Park Visitor Centre, London

Landscape
Thames Barrier Park, London
Eastside City Park, Birmingham
Royal Victoria Square, London
Bankside Walkway, London
Canary Wharf Footbridges, London
Sneinton Market Square, Nottingham
Putney Wharf Riverside, Putney, London
Short Blue Place, Barking, London

Urban design
Springfield Hospital Grounds, London
Reims Cultural Quarter, Reims, France
Athletes Village Guidelines, London
Woolston Riverside, Southampton
Ayr Citadel, Ayr
Wembley Masterplan, London

Awards
The practice has won 10 RIBA Awards, and 7 Civic Trust Awards as well as many others.

References

External links
 Official website
 Twitter
 Instagram

Architecture firms based in London
Companies established in 1989